Lyle Peters commonly known as Lala's (born 9 February 1991) is a South African footballer who plays for Al-Oruba SC in Oman Professional League.

Club career

Youth career
Born and raised in Cape Town, South Africa, Lyle began his footballing career at the age of 5 with the junior level teams of Strandfontein-based, Strandfontein AFC in 1996. In 2003, he signed a one-year contract with Kuils River-based, F.C. Fortune. In 2004, he moved back to Strandfontein and his former club, Strandfontein AFC. In 2006, he signed a long-term contract with Johannesburg-based, Bidvest Wits F.C.

South Africa
Lyle began his professional footballing career in 2009 with Parow-based, Premier Soccer League club, Ajax Cape Town F.C. In 2011, he moved to Ladsdowne where he signed a short-term contract with SAFA Second Division club, Santos F.C. In 2012, he moved to Phuthaditjhaba where he signed a short-term contract with National First Division club, African Warriors F.C. Later in the year 2012, he signed a six-month contract with another SAFA Second Division club, Port Elizabeth-based, Bay Stars F.C. In 2013, he signed a one-year contract with SAFA Second Division club, Ikapa Sporting F.C. In 2014, he signed a one-year contract with ASD Cape Town.

Oman

Al-Oruba SC

He first moved out of South Africa in 2015 to the Middle East and more accurately to Oman where on 3 September 2015, he signed a one-year contract with Sur-based, Oman Professional League club, Al-Oruba SC. He made his debut for the club on 8 September 2015 in a 1–1 draw against Muscat Club in the 2015–16 Oman Professional League Cup. He made his Oman Professional League debut on 13 September 2015 in a 3–1 win over newly promoted side, Salalah SC and also assisted the third and final goal of the match which was scored by former Omani international, Mohammed Taqi Al-Lawati and scored his first goal on 27 November 2015 in a 2–0 win over Al-Nahda Club. He scored his first goal for the club on 18 November 2015 in a 2–1 win over Muscat Club in the 2015–16 Oman Professional League Cup. He made his Sultan Qaboos Cup debut and scored his first goal in the competition on 30 December 2015 in a 2–1 win over fierce rivals, Sur SC. He also made his AFC Cup debut on 24 February 2016 in a 2–1 win over Al-Wahda SC of Syria.

Club career statistics

References

External links
Lyle Peters – SOCCER PUNTER
Lyle Peters – psl.co.za
Lyle Peters – srbfc.co.za

1991 births
Living people
Sportspeople from Cape Town
South African soccer players
South African expatriate soccer players
Association football forwards
Cape Town Spurs F.C. players
Santos F.C. (South Africa) players
Ikapa Sporting F.C. players
Al-Orouba SC players
Expatriate footballers in Oman
South African expatriate sportspeople in Oman
African Warriors F.C. players